The Secret River is a 2005 Australian historical novel by Kate Grenville.

The Secret River may also refer to:

Related to the novel by Grenville
The Secret River (play), the play by Andrew Bovell, first performed in 2013
The Secret River (TV series), the 2015 television series

Other uses
The Secret River, alternative title for 2010 Korean film Secret Love

The Secret River (Rawlings book), a children's book by Marjorie Kinnan Rawlings, published in 1955

The Secret River (video game), a 1984 video game